Fitch is a family name of Old French origin.  Like most ancient surnames, there are a number of possible origins to the name.  It may originate from the Old French word fissell meaning "an iron-pointed implement".  It may also derive from William de Gernon who inherited the barony of Stansted Mountfitchet in Essex, England and took the surname "de Montifitchet".  His descendants eventually shortened the name first to "Fitche" and then to "Fitch".

Related names include Fitchet, Fitchell, Fitchen and Fitchett, as well as others.  Earliest records show the name and derivatives occurring from the 12th century onwards.  It may also have been used as a personal name.

People

In arts and entertainment

Writers
 Brian T. Fitch, French-Canadian nonfiction author
 Clyde Fitch, American playwright
 George Helgesen Fitch (1877–1915), American author, humorist, and journalist
 Janet Fitch, American author
 Lucy Fitch Perkins, (1865–1937), American children's author
 Noël Riley Fitch, author
 Sheree Fitch, Canadian children's author

In other arts
 Albert Fitch Bellows (1829–1883), American landscape painter
 Alice Underwood Fitch (1862-1936), American painter
 Graham Fitch, pianist
 John Fitch (computer scientist) (born 1945), computer scientist, mathematician and composer
 Niles Fitch (born 2001), American actor
 Rodney Fitch, English designer

In business
 Benjamin Franklin Fitch (1877-1956), author of the concept of containers in the US before the Second World War
 Ezra Fitch, New York lawyer and cofounder of Abercrombie & Fitch, a clothing company
 George Ashmore Fitch, YMCA Administrative Director
 George B. Fitch, American businessman, politician, and Olympic organizer
 John Fitch (inventor) (1743–1798), early American inventor, built the first steamboat in the United States in 1786
 John Knowles Fitch (1880–1943), founder of Fitch Ratings, Ltd
 John Thomas Fitch, father and son of J. T. Fitch & Son, drapers of Adelaide, South Australia
 Ralph Fitch, British merchant-explorer of India and Burma

In government, military, and politics

United States
 Alva Revista Fitch, U.S. Army Lieutenant General
 Asa Fitch (Representative) (1765–1843), US Congress representative
 Ashbel P. Fitch (1848–1904), New York politician
 Aubrey Fitch, U.S. Navy admiral
 Charles C. Fitch (1842–1899), Michigan state representative
 Chauncey Fitch Cleveland (1799–1887), US politician
 Ferris S. Fitch Jr. (1853–1920), Michigan Superintendent of Public Instruction
 George B. Fitch, American businessman, politician, and Olympic organizer
 Graham N. Fitch, US Representative and Senator
 Jabez W. Fitch,  Democratic lieutenant-governor of Ohio from 1878 to 1880
 LeRoy Fitch, officer during the American Civil War
 Thomas Fitch (governor) (IV) (1699–1774), governor of the Connecticut Colony
 Thomas Fitch, V (1725–1795), representative from Norwalk to the Connecticut House of Representatives, traditionally believed to be the original "Yankee Doodle Dandy."
 Thomas Fitch (politician), United States Representative from Nevada

Other countries
 Alan Fitch (1915–1985), British Labour Party politician
 Bruce Fitch, New Brunswick, Canada politician

In science and academia
 Asa Fitch, American entomologist
 Frederic Brenton Fitch, American logician and inventor of Fitch-style calculus
 Henry Sheldon Fitch, American herpetologist
 James Marston Fitch, historic preservationist
 John Fitch (classicist), classical scholar
 John Fitch (computer scientist) (born 1945), computer scientist, mathematician and composer
 John A. Fitch (1881–1959), writer and professor of labor relations
 John Nugent Fitch (1840–1927), botanical illustrator
 Joshua Girling Fitch (1824–1903), English educationalist
 Marc Fitch, English historian and philanthropist
 Val Logsdon Fitch, Nobel Prize-winning nuclear physicist
 W. Tecumseh Fitch, evolutionary psychologist
 Walter Hood Fitch (1817–1892), Scottish botanical artist
 Walter M. Fitch (1929–2011), American evolutionary biologist

In sport
 Alfred Fitch, American Olympian
 Alison Fitch, New Zealand Olympian
 Bill Fitch (1932–2022), American basketball coach
 Gerald Fitch, American basketball player
 Harrison Fitch, American basketball player
 Horatio Fitch, American Olympian
 John Fitch (racing driver) (1917–2012), racing driver, inventor of innovative safety devices and descendant of John Fitch (inventor)
 Jon Fitch, American mixed martial arts fighter
 Joyce Fitch, Australian tennis player
 Nathaniel Fitch (born 1958), former heavyweight boxer
 Zarnell Fitch (born 1983), American football player

In other fields
 Charles Fitch, American preacher
 Dennis E. Fitch, American commercial airline pilot
 Ed Fitch (born 1937), occult author and Wiccan High Priest
 Henry D. Fitch (1767–1849), early settler of San Diego, California
 James P. Fitch, notable in the early history of the Boy Scouts of America
 John Fitch, Massachusetts settler for whom Fitchburg, Massachusetts is named
 John Fitch (racing driver) (1917–2012), racing driver, inventor of innovative safety devices and descendant of John Fitch (inventor)
 John H. Fitch, namesake of YMCA Camp Fitch in Springfield, Pennsylvania
 Ralph Fitch, British merchant-explorer of India and Burma
 Thomas Fitch (settler) (I) (1612–1704), founding settler of Norwalk, Connecticut

See also
Fitch (disambiguation)

References

External links
Fitch Family History and Genealogy
Fitch Family History in the UK